The City of Caulfield was a local government area about  southeast of Melbourne, the state capital of Victoria, Australia.

History

Caulfield was incorporated as a road district on 15 October 1857, with the first Caulfield Roads Board elected in November 1857. It had control over the roads in an area bounded by Warrigal Road, Hotham Street, Dandenong Road, North Road and Brighton Road. It became a shire on 17 April 1871. In the 1880s, the area was a market gardening district, with  under cultivation, but by the end of the century, its character had become more residential. As such, it became a borough on 30 April 1901 and a town on 23 September 1901. It was proclaimed a city on 26 July 1913. On 16 April 1923, it lost part of its area (the current suburb of Hughesdale) to the Borough of Oakleigh.

On 15 December 1994, the City of Caulfield was abolished, and along with parts of the City of Moorabbin, was merged into the newly created City of Glen Eira. The councillors of both councils were dismissed.

Council meetings were held at the Caulfield Town Hall, built in 1885, at Glen Eira Road and Hawthorn Road, Caulfield. It presently serves as a service centre for the City of Glen Eira.

Population

* Estimate in the 1958 Victorian Year Book.

References

External links
 Victorian Places - Caulfield

Caulfield
1857 establishments in Australia
City of Glen Eira
1994 disestablishments in Australia